Tauron Polska Energia S.A. is an energy holding company in Poland. It is headquartered in Katowice. The company owns power and heat generation and distribution, and coal mining assets through a number of companies, particularly in south-western Poland. It is the second biggest company in terms of energy production in Poland. 

Tauron was established in December 2006 as Energetyka Południe. In 2007, the Ministry of State Treasury of Poland transferred to the company 85% of shares in Południowy Koncern Energetyczny, 85% of shares in Enion, 85% of shares in EnergiaPro, 85% of shares in Elektrownia Stalowa Wola, 95.5% of shares in Elektrociepłownia Tychy, and 95.66% stake in Przedsiębiorstwo Energetyki Cieplnej. As a result, the Tauron Group became one of the largest companies in Poland.

Sponsorship

The company was the official jersey sponsor of Poland's national basketball team at the 2015 EuroBasket.

The company is also the strategic sponsor of Polish football club Raków Częstochowa.

References

External links
 

Electric power companies of Poland
Polish brands
Government-owned companies of Poland
Companies listed on the Warsaw Stock Exchange
Energy companies established in 2006
Polish companies established in 2006